The 2017–18 season was Villarreal Club de Fútbol's 95th season in existence and the club's 5th consecutive season in the top flight of Spanish football. In addition to the domestic league, Villarreal participated in this season's editions of the Copa del Rey and the UEFA Europa League. The season covered the period from 1 July 2017 to 30 June 2018.

Squad

 (on loan from Milan)

Transfers
List of Spanish football transfers summer 2017#Villarreal

In

Out

Competitions

Overall record

La Liga

League table

Results summary

Results by round

Matches

Copa del Rey

Round of 32

Round of 16

UEFA Europa League

Group stage

Knockout phase

Round of 32

Statistics

Appearances and goals
Last updated on 20 May 2018.

|-
! colspan=14 style=background:#dcdcdc; text-align:center|Goalkeepers

|-
! colspan=14 style=background:#dcdcdc; text-align:center|Defenders

|-
! colspan=14 style=background:#dcdcdc; text-align:center|Midfielders

|-
! colspan=14 style=background:#dcdcdc; text-align:center|Forwards

|-
! colspan=14 style=background:#dcdcdc; text-align:center| Players who have made an appearance or had a squad number this season but have left the club

|}

Cards
Accounts for all competitions. Last updated on 19 December 2017.

Clean sheets
Last updated on 19 December 2017.

Notes

References

Villarreal CF seasons
Villarreal CF
Villarreal CF